El Cerrito Plaza may refer to:

El Cerrito Plaza (shopping center), a shopping mall in El Cerrito, California
El Cerrito Plaza station, the Bay Area Rapid Transit station located at the mall